Diego Abatantuono (born 20 May 1955) is an Italian cinema and theatre actor, and screenwriter, three-time winner of the Nastro d'Argento.

Biography and career
Abatantuono was born in Milan to a father of Apulian origin and a mother from Como. The latter worked as wardrober in a Milanese jazz and later cabaret club, Derby, whose owner was Abatantuono's uncle. He started to work at Derby first in lighting, then as artistic director and later as an actor.

His first approach to cinema took place thanks to the comedic group , who brought him with them to audition. Here he was noticed by director Romolo Guerrieri, who offered him a part in the film Young, Violent, Dangerous. He participated in comedies such as "Saxofone", Fantozzi contro tutti, then he returned to work at Derby where he was discovered by TV showman, film director and talent scout Renzo Arbore, who cast him as "Don Gabriele" in his 1980 controversial film Il Pap'occhio.

The first real starring role is obtained at the insistence of prize-winner actress Monica Vitti, who wanted him in Il tango della gelosia. The success he obtained with this role convinced Carlo Vanzina to produce Eccezzziunale... veramente, for which Abatantuono had written the screenplay. In this film, he plays three different roles as a fan of Italy's three main football teams: A.C. Milan, Internazionale, and Juventus. His performance became iconic and the film turned out to be a cult film in Italy. Twenty years after, he reprised all three roles for the 2006 sequel Eccezzziunale...veramente - Capitolo secondo... me, which featured cameos from then-current Milan players Paolo Maldini, Massimo Ambrosini, Alessandro Costacurta, Dida, Andriy Shevchenko, and Gennaro Gattuso in the 2005–06 UEFA Champions League.

In the mid-1980s he abandoned the character who had given him success, and for some time he devoted himself to theatrical performances. But it was Pupi Avati who led him into the turning point, having understood his potential as an actor, even a dramatic one. Avati will include him in the diptych Christmas Present (1986).  For his performance in this film, Abatantuono won a Nastro d'Argento for Best supporting Actor. The film had a sequel, Christmas Rematch.

In Luigi Comencini's A Boy from Calabria (1987), he played a poor farmer who wishes his eldest son will graduate from school to get out of his miserable condition, and does not understand the boy's passion for running. After this role, Abatantuono founded his own production company, Colorado Film, thanks to which he reaffirmed himself as one of the most interesting actors of the new Italian cinema, with Giuseppe Bertolucci's I cammelli (1988) and Gabriele Salvatores' film cycle, which consecrated him definitively: Marrakech Express (1989), Turné (1990), the Oscar-winning Mediterraneo (1991), Puerto Escondido (1992), Nirvana (1997), Amnèsia (2002), I'm Not Scared (2003), Happy Family (2010) and Volare (2019).

Abatantuono is also a popular figure of Italian television shows. He is well known to be a long-time A.C. Milan fan.

Filmography

Actor 

Young, Violent, Dangerous (1976)
Saxofone (1978)
 (1980)
Arrivano i gatti (1980)
In the Pope's Eye (1980)
Fantozzi contro tutti (1980)
Prickly Pears (1980)
Una vacanza bestiale (1981)
I fichissimi (1981)
Il tango della gelosia (1981)
 (1981)
Viuuulentemente mia (1982)
An Ideal Adventure (1982)
Eccezzziunale... veramente (1982)
Scusa se è poco (1982)
Grand Hotel Excelsior (1982)
Attila flagello di Dio (1982)
 (1982)
Il ras del quartiere (1983)
Tranches de vie (1985)
Christmas Present (1986)
A Boy from Calabria (1987)
The Last Minute (1987)
The Strangeness of Life (1987)
Kamikazen: Last Night in Milan (1987)
The Camels (1988)
Marrakech Express (1989)
On Tour (Turnè) (1989)
Vacanze di Natale '90 (1990)
Mediterraneo (1991)
Puerto Escondido (1992)
 (1992)
The Storm Is Coming (1992)
For Love, Only for Love (1993)
The Bull (1994)
 (1995)
Camerieri (1995)
The Barber of Rio (1996)
Nirvana (1997)
Bedrooms (1997)
Children of Hannibal (1998)
Paparazzi (1998)
Marriages (1998)
The Best Man (1998)
Tifosi (1999)
Nightwatchman (2000)
Unfair Competition (2000)
Our Tropical Island (2000)
Amnèsia (2001)
Momo (2001)
Christmas Rematch (2003)
I'm Not Scared (2003)
Really SSSupercool: Chapter Two (2006)
A Dinner for Them to Meet  (2007)
2061: An Exceptional Year (2007)
 (2007)
I mostri oggi (2009)
The Friends at the Margherita Cafe (2009)
Things from Another World (2011)
Buona giornata (2012)
 (2012)
The Worst Christmas of My Life (2012)
Indovina chi viene a Natale? (2013)
People Who Are Well (2014)
Soap Opera (2014)
Belli di papà (2015)
Mr. Happiness (2017)
My Big Fat Italian Wedding (2018)
Volare (2019)
La mia banda suona il pop (2020)
When Mom Is Away... With the Family (2020)

Screenwriter 
Eccezzziunale... veramente (1982)
Il ras del quartiere (1983)
Puerto escondido (1992)
In barca a vela contromano (1997)
Figli di Annibale (1998)

Awards
David di Donatello
 1987 Nomination for David di Donatello for Best Supporting Actor for Christmas Present
 1991 Nomination for David di Donatello for Best Actor for Mediterraneo
 1994 Nomination for David di Donatello for Best Actor for For Love, Only for Love
 1997 Nomination for David di Donatello for Best Supporting Actor for Nirvana
 2004 Nomination for David di Donatello for Best Supporting Actor for I'm Not Scared
 2021 David Special Award

Nastro d'argento
 1987 Nastro d'Argento for Best Supporting Actor for Christmas Present
 1991 Nomination for Nastro d'Argento for Best Actor for Turné
 1992 Nomination for Nastro d'Argento for Best Actor for Mediterraneo
 1993 Nastro d'Argento for Best Actor for Puerto Escondido
 2001 Nomination for Nastro d'Argento for Best Actor for Unfair Competition
 2004 Nastro d'Argento for Best Supporting Actor for I'm Not Scared
 2007 Nomination for Nastro d'Argento for Best Actor for A Dinner for Them to Meet

Globo d'oro
 2001 Nomination for Italian Golden Globe for Best Actor for  Unfair Competition

Ciak d'oro
 1991 Ciak d'oro for Best Actor for Mediterraneo
 2003 Ciak d'oro for Best Supporting Actor for I'm Not Scared

References

External links 
 
 Page with links to main films

1955 births
Male actors from Milan
Living people
20th-century Italian comedians
20th-century Italian screenwriters
Italian male screenwriters
People of Apulian descent
Ciak d'oro winners
Nastro d'Argento winners